Romanian singer, songwriter and producer Marius Moga has written songs for himself, his duo Morandi and for other singers. He began earning money by writing songs during his teenage years. The first recognition he received was in high school when his band Talk to Me had their song "Noaptea" picked up by several radio stations in his hometown Alba Iulia. His breakthrough came when Romanian group Akcent's founder Adrian Sînă invited him to produce the band's second album when he was 19. The album, titled În culori, for which he wrote every song, was released in January 2002 and received a platinum certification later that year from the Uniunea Producătorilor de Fonograme din România (UPFR).

In September 2004, Moga formed the music duo Morandi alongside  and released their debut single, "Love Me", in November, which peaked at number two in Romania. The duo released three albums Reverse (2005), Mind Fields (2006), and N3XT (2007), the latter including the single "Angels (Love Is the Answer)", which reached number one in several countries and received a seven-time platinum certification in Russia.  At the 2008 MTV Europe Music Awards, the duo received the award for Best Romanian Act.  As a soloist, Moga released his debut single, "Pe barba mea", in May 2014, which reached number one on the Airplay 100 chart.

Throughout his career, Moga has written for numerous mainstream Romanian acts such as Akcent, Andreea Bălan, Anna Lesko and Paula Seling. He co-wrote several songs which topped the Airplay 100 chart including Andra's "Inevitabil va fi bine", Florian Rus and 's "Străzile din București" and "Slăbiciuni" by DJ Project featuring Andia. Furthermore, he contributed to and was featured on Guess Who's "Tot mai sus" and Shift's "Sus pe toc", both of which peaked at number one in Romania. He had several unsuccessful attempts at representing Romania at the Eurovision Song Contest for the 2003, 2007, 2008, and 2009 editions. Outside of the Romanian music scene, he has also written songs for international acts like Maroon 5, Train, and Allie X. Aside from his work with various artists, Moga was also involved with composing for the media industry. He wrote songs for the soundtrack albums of Romanian soap operas  and Chiquititas, and also wrote and performed the former's ending theme. Additionally, he wrote songs for the soundtracks of the films 7 Seconds and Faci sau taci.

Songs

Notes

References

Moga, Marius, List of songs written by